Ray Nicholson is an American actor.  He appeared opposite Diane Kruger in the Neil LaBute film Out of the Blue (2022).  On television, he appeared in the 2021 Amazon Prime Video series Panic.

Personal life
Nicholson is the son of Jack Nicholson and Rebecca Broussard.

Select filmography

References

External links
 

Living people
1992 births
21st-century American male actors
American male film actors
American male television actors